, is a Japanese comedian and actor. He is a member of the comedy duo 130R and former cast member of one of Downtown's previous shows. He usually appears in their batsu games.

Filmography (actor)

Movies
2001 Desert Moon ... Interviewer
2002 The Blessing Bell ... Prisoner
2003 9 Souls as Fujio
2003 Josee, the Tiger and the Fish ... The Manager
2004 Space Police
2005 Cromartie High: The Movie ... Masked Takenouchi, also screenwriter
2005 Yaji and Kita: The Midnight Pilgrims ... Naniwa Hotto
2005 Hanging Garden ... Takashi Kyobashi
2005 The Great Yokai War
2005 Kamen Rider: The First
2006 One Missed Call: Final ... Professor Kibe, 
2006 Ghost Train
2006 Death Note: The Last Name ... Hikima
2007 Pile Driver
2007 Tokyo Tower: Mom and Me, and Sometimes Dad
2007 Dai Nipponjin ... Female Niounojyuu
2007 Grow
2007 Erotic Rampo: Ningen-isu
2007 Negative Happy Chainsaw Edge
2007 Big Man Japan ... Female Stink Monster 
2008 Tokyo Gore Police
2008 Tamami: The Baby's Curse
2008 Love Exposure
2009 Your Story
2009 Air Doll
2010 Scabbard Samurai
2011 Karate-Robo Zaborgar
2012 Be My Slave
2014 Heisei Riders vs. Shōwa Riders: Kamen Rider Taisen feat. Super Sentai
2016 Kako: My Sullen Past
2018 Ashita ni Kakeru Hashi
2018 The Miracle of Crybaby Shottan
2021 First Love
2022 The Mukoda Barber Shop
2022 Signature
2023 Revolver Lily

Television
2006 Imo Tako Nankin ... Kozo Ikeuchi
2011 Carnation
2019 Idaten
2019 The Naked Director
2020 Ochoyan
2020 Detective Yuri Rintaro ... Asahara
2022 Hiru ... Yashima
2022 Short Program

Filmography (director)
2010 The King of Jail Breakers
2011 Mask of Moonlight
2017 Hibana: Spark

References

External links
 
 Itsuji Itao at the Japanese Movie Database

1963 births
Living people
Japanese comedians
Japanese male film actors
Japanese male television actors
Male actors from Osaka
People from Tondabayashi, Osaka
20th-century Japanese male actors
21st-century Japanese male actors